The tetractys, or tetrad, or the tetractys of the decad is a triangular figure consisting of ten points arranged in four rows: one, two, three, and four points in each row, which is the geometrical representation of the fourth triangular number. As a mystical symbol, it was very important to the secret worship of Pythagoreanism. There were four seasons, and the number was also associated with planetary motions and music.

Pythagorean symbol

 The first four numbers symbolize the musica universalis and the Cosmos as: 
 (1) Unity (Monad)
 (2) Dyad – Power – Limit/Unlimited (peras/apeiron)
 (3) Harmony (Triad)
 (4) Kosmos (Tetrad)
 The four rows add up to ten, which was unity of a higher order (The Dekad).
 The Tetractys symbolizes the four classical elements—air, fire, water, and earth.
 The Tetractys represented the organization of space:
 the first row represented zero dimensions (a point)
 the second row represented one dimension (a line of two points)
 the third row represented two dimensions (a plane defined by a triangle of three points)
 the fourth row represented three dimensions (a tetrahedron defined by four points)

A prayer of the Pythagoreans shows the importance of the Tetractys (sometimes called the "Mystic Tetrad"), as the prayer was addressed to it.

As a portion of the secret religion, initiates were required to swear a secret oath by the Tetractys. They then served as novices, which required them to observe silence for a period of five years.

The Pythagorean oath also mentioned the Tetractys:
By that pure, holy, four lettered name on high,
nature's eternal fountain and supply,
the parent of all souls that living be,
by him, with faith find oath, I swear to thee.

It is said that the Pythagorean musical system was based on the Tetractys as the rows can be read as the ratios of 4:3 (perfect fourth), 3:2 (perfect fifth), 2:1 (octave), forming the basic intervals of the Pythagorean scales. That is, Pythagorean scales are generated from combining pure fourths (in a 4:3 relation), pure fifths (in a 3:2 relation), and the simple ratios of the unison 1:1 and the octave 2:1.  Note that the diapason, 2:1 (octave), and the diapason plus diapente, 3:1 (compound fifth or perfect twelfth), are consonant intervals according to the tetractys of the decad, but that the diapason plus diatessaron, 8:3 (compound fourth or perfect eleventh), is not.

Kabbalist symbol

In the work by anthropologist Raphael Patai entitled The Hebrew Goddess, the author argues that the tetractys and its mysteries influenced the early Kabbalah. A Hebrew tetractys has the letters of the Tetragrammaton inscribed on the ten positions of the tetractys, from right to left. It has been argued that the Kabbalistic Tree of Life, with its ten spheres of emanation, is in some way connected to the tetractys, but its form is not that of a triangle. The occultist Dion Fortune writes: 
The point is assigned to Kether; 
the line to Chokmah;
the two-dimensional plane to Binah; 
consequently the three-dimensional solid naturally falls to Chesed.

The relationship between geometrical shapes  and the first four Sephirot is analogous to the geometrical correlations in Tetraktys, shown above under #Pythagorean symbol, and unveils the relevance of the Tree of Life with the Tetraktys.

Tarot card reading arrangement
In a Tarot reading, the various positions of the tetractys provide a representation for forecasting future events by signifying according to various occult disciplines, such as Alchemy. Below is only a single variation for interpretation.

The first row of a single position represents the Premise of the reading, forming a foundation for understanding all the other cards.

The second row of two positions represents the cosmos and the individual and their relationship.
 The Light Card to the right represents the influence of the cosmos leading the individual to an action.
 The Dark Card to the left represents the reaction of the cosmos to the actions of the individual.

The third row of three positions represents three kinds of decisions an individual must make.
 The Creator Card is rightmost, representing new decisions and directions that may be made.
 The Sustainer Card is in the middle, representing decisions to keep balance, and things that should not change.
 The Destroyer Card is leftmost, representing old decisions and directions that should not be continued.

The fourth row of four positions represents the four Greek elements.
 The Fire card is rightmost, representing dynamic creative force, ambitions, and personal will.
 The Air card is to the right middle, representing the mind, thoughts, and strategies toward goals.
 The Water card is to the left middle, representing the emotions, feelings, and whims.
 The Earth card is leftmost, representing physical realities of day to day living.

Occurrence

The tetractys occurs (generally coincidentally) in the following:
 the baryon decuplet
 an archbishop's coat of arms
 the arrangement of bowling pins in ten-pin bowling
 the arrangement of billiard balls in ten-ball pool
 a Chinese checkers board
 the "Christmas Tree" formation in association football

In poetry
In English-language poetry, a tetractys is a syllable-counting form with five lines.  The first line has one syllable, the second has two syllables, the third line has three syllables, the fourth line has four syllables, and the fifth line has ten syllables.  A sample tetractys would look like this:

Mantrum
Your /
fury /
confuses /
us all greatly. /
Volatile, big-bodied tots are selfish.  //

The tetractys was created by Ray Stebbing, who said the following about his newly created form:

"The tetractys could be Britain's answer to the haiku. Its challenge is to express a complete thought, profound or comic, witty or wise, within the narrow compass of twenty syllables.

See also
Pascal's triangle

References

Further reading
von Franz, Marie-Louise.  Number and Time:  Reflections Leading Towards a Unification of Psychology and Physics.  Rider & Company, London, 1974.  
Fideler, D. ed. The Pythagorean Sourcebook and Library. Phanes Press, 1987.
The Theoretic Arithmetic of the Pythagoreans – Thomas Taylor

External links
Examples of Tetractys poems

Dot patterns
Genres of poetry
Greek mathematics
History of mathematics
History of poetry
Kabbalah
Mathematical symbols
Poetic forms
Pythagorean symbols
Pythagoreanism
Tarotology
Concepts in ancient Greek metaphysics